The Three Musketeers is a 1993 action-adventure comedy film from Walt Disney Pictures, Caravan Pictures (first film produced), and The Kerner Entertainment Company, directed by Stephen Herek from a screenplay by David Loughery. It stars Charlie Sheen, Kiefer Sutherland, Chris O'Donnell, Oliver Platt, Tim Curry and Rebecca De Mornay.

The film is loosely based on the 1844 novel The Three Musketeers (Les Trois Mousquetaires) by Alexandre Dumas. It recounts the adventures of d'Artagnan on his quest to join the three title characters in becoming a musketeer. However, this adaptation simplifies and alters the story.

Plot 
In 1625, young-but-skilled fencer d'Artagnan sets off for Paris, France in hopes to follow in his murdered father's footsteps and become a member of the musketeers: the personal guard of the King of France. He is pursued by Gérard and his brothers, accused of blemishing their sister's honor. Meanwhile, Captain Rochefort of the Cardinal's Guards disbands the musketeers per the orders of Cardinal Richelieu, the King's Minister, ostensibly to help fight in an impending war with England. Rochefort informs Richelieu that three musketeers refused to relinquish their duties: Athos, Porthos, and Aramis.

In Paris, d'Artagnan "rescues" the queen's handmaidens from their own bodyguards, and after a scolding, takes a liking to one, Constance. In the city d'Artagnan encounters each of the Three Musketeers separately, unaware of their identities or association, resulting in a separate duel arranged with each. At the arranged location, Athos, Porthos and Aramis reveal themselves as musketeers to d'Artagnan's surprise. Before they can duel, a Captain of the Cardinal's Guard arrives with four other guards to arrest the musketeers; although d'Artagnan is not sought by the guards, he allies with the musketeers during the skirmish. The Musketeers kill four guards, while d'Artagnan outduels the Captain, who falls to his death. Impressed but displeased at d'Artagnan's involvement, the musketeers leave d'Artagnan behind after encouraging him to flee and maintain his innocence. When more of the Cardinal's Guards arrive, d'Artagnan is captured.

D'Artagnan escapes his cell and eavesdrops on a conversation between Richelieu and the mysterious Milady de Winter, where the Cardinal plots to supplant the King, tasking Milady with delivering a secret treaty to England's Duke of Buckingham. D'Artagnan is caught by Rochefort without having seen Milady's face. Richelieu orders him executed for refusing to give up the musketeers' location, but he is saved by the musketeers. As they flee, d'Artagnan reveals Richelieu's plans; they decide to intercept the spy at Calais and retrieve the treaty to prove Richelieu's guilt.

During a skirmish, the party splits up; d'Artagnan rides ahead to Calais, but passes out from exhaustion and is found by Milady de Winter. He wakes in a bed stripped of his weapons and clothes as Milady tries to seduce him. d'Artagnan speaks openly of his plans, not knowing she is the spy. She attempts to kill him, but he convinces her to keep him alive. As her party boards the boat to England, they are confronted by the musketeers. Milady attempts to run away but is stopped by Athos, who is revealed to have been her first husband, but betrayed her to the authorities when he found out she was branded a murderer. The musketeers retrieve the treaty and Milady is sentenced to death for the murder of her second husband, Lord de Winter; just before she is executed, Athos begs her forgiveness. Moved, she reveals the Cardinal's plans to assassinate the king at his birthday celebration, then throws herself off a cliff to her death.

Athos, Porthos and Aramis send missives to rally the rest of the musketeers. Richelieu and Rochefort hired a sharpshooter; during the assembly, d'Artagnan interrupts the sniper's shot, which narrowly misses the king. The musketeers reveal themselves, and Richelieu blames them for the attempted assassination.

As the three face off with the Cardinal's guards, men rush to their aid and reveal themselves as musketeers. The two forces battle as Richelieu takes the king and queen hostage, shooting Aramis in the chest before fleeing to the dungeon with Athos and Porthos in pursuit. d'Artagnan duels Rochefort and is disarmed; as Rochefort gloats about having killed d'Artagnan's father, Constance retrieves and throws him his sword and d'Artagnan promptly kills Rochefort.

Athos and Porthos arrive just as Richelieu's boat leaves on an underground river, with Richelieu vowing to return. The boatman then reveals himself as Aramis, his crucifix having stopped the bullet. Aramis moves to apprehend the Cardinal, but King Louis punches Richelieu himself, knocking him into the river.

The musketeers are reinstated by the king, and d'Artagnan is offered anything he wants; he chooses to serve Louis as a musketeer. Outside the musketeer headquarters, Gérard and his brothers arrive and challenge d'Artagnan to a duel; Porthos reminds him that musketeers not only protect King and country, but also each other. Gérard and his brothers are then chased off by the entire musketeer division.

Cast 

 Charlie Sheen as Aramis
 Kiefer Sutherland as Athos
 Chris O'Donnell as D'Artagnan
 Oliver Platt as Porthos
 Tim Curry as Cardinal Richelieu
 Rebecca De Mornay as Milady de Winter
 Gabrielle Anwar as Queen Anne
 Michael Wincott as Captain Rochefort
 Paul McGann as Girard and Jussac
 Julie Delpy as Constance
 Hugh O'Conor as King Louis
 Christopher Adamson as Henri
 Herbert Fux as an Innkeeper
 Bob Anderson (Uncredited) as The King's Fencing Instructor

Production 
In 1992 Walt Disney Pictures, Columbia Pictures, and TriStar Pictures simultaneously began development on three separate adaptations of The Three Musketeers. Disney purchased a screenplay for the film from David Loughery for $650,000 after he had already been hired to write the screenplay of the Columbia adaptation, and Columbia producer Brad Wyman accused Disney of stealing concepts which were its intellectual property. The matter was settled out of court, and the Columbia adaptation was cancelled. The TriStar adaptation was to be written by Joel Gross and directed by Jeremiah S. Chechik, and was to be more adult-oriented and faithful to Alexandre Dumas' original novel than the Disney version.

Charlie Sheen was originally sought for the role of Porthos before he was cast as Aramis, while Brendan Fraser was the first choice for the role of 'dArtagnan. Brad Pitt and Stephen Dorff also turned down the role of d'Artagnan, which ultimately went to O'Donnell. William Baldwin, Jean-Claude Van Damme, Al Pacino, Johnny Depp, Cary Elwes, Robert Downey Jr., and Gary Oldman were also sought out by Disney for parts in the film. Winona Ryder was considered for the role of Milady de Winter, but dropped out and Rebecca De Mornay was cast. Kiefer Sutherland, Chris O'Donnell and Oliver Platt all endured six weeks of fencing and riding lessons. Sheen missed this training as he was still filming Hot Shots! Part Deux. Depp was cast in Chechik's adaptation at TriStar after Baldwin, Downey Jr., and Sutherland were also considered for roles in the film. Oliver Platt had also been approached to play Porthos in that version as well. However, it never entered production.

Cinergi Pictures, the film's production studio, dropped the film because its chairman Andrew G. Vajna disapproved of Disney's casting choices. Jordan Kerner and Jon Avnet were briefly involved with the film but also quit in order to focus on When a Man Loves a Woman. Disney President David Haberman hired Caravan Pictures under Joe Roth and Roger Birnbaum to produce the film. Roth and Birnbaum had previously bid against both Columbia and Disney for Loughery's script while working at 20th Century Fox.

Disney decided against shooting the film on-location in Paris because much of the city's French Baroque architecture had been destroyed in World War II. After initially settling on Barrandov Studios in Prague, the production moved to Vienna after the local government offered $2 million. Principal photography began on April 26, 1993, with a budget of $30 million. The Three Musketeers was mostly shot in Perchtoldsdorf, Austria, where De Mornay attended high school and college.

Filming locations 
Filming locations included Charlestown, Cornwall, UK, and Castle Landsee (Burgenland); Burg Liechtenstein, Maria Enzersdorf, Hinterbrühl, Korneuburg (Lower Austria); and Vienna (particularly Hofburg) in Austria. Some sequences were shot in Cornwall, UK. A small woods called Golitha Falls was used in one sequence when the musketeers are being pursued by guards. The small harbor village of Charlestown is home to the galleon that was used in a night-shoot.

Reception 
The film was highly anticipated after Disney announced that its September 1993 test screenings for the film showed the most positive response it had ever received from an audience. However, after its release it received highly negative reviews from both critics and fans.

On Rotten Tomatoes the film finds an approval rating of 30% based on 30 reviews, with an average rating of 4.8/10. The site's critics consensus reads: "Its starry trio of do-gooders may promise to fight 'one for all, all for one,' but this Three Musketeers is a slickly unmemorable update bound to satisfy very few." At Metacritic, the film has a weighted average score of 43 out of 100, based on 24 critics, indicating "mixed or average reviews". Audiences polled by CinemaScore gave the film an average grade of "A−" on an A+ to F scale.

Film critic Leonard Maltin christened this version Young Swords, as it reunited Sheen and Sutherland, both of Young Guns fame. Janet Maslin of The New York Times described the movie as "Conceived frankly as a product, complete with hit-to-be theme song over the closing credits, this adventure film cares less about storytelling than about keeping the Musketeers' feathered hats on straight whenever they go galloping." Michael Wilmington of the Chicago Tribune wrote that "The new Walt Disney version of The Three Musketeers-plushly mounted, but ineptly written and cast-gallops along like a gargantuan tutti-frutti wagon running amok."

Owen Gleiberman of Entertainment Weekly wrote that the film "is livelier than its obvious models, the Young]] [[Young Guns II|Guns films, but as crowd pleasers go it’s plodding and synthetic, with little of the vitality or satirical dash that marked Richard Lester’s sophisticated slapstick version (made in 1974). The director, Stephen Herek, would have been smart to take more of his cues from Platt’s performance; on the few occasions when the film slips into brattish MTV knowingness, it at least has its own cheeky flavor. But neither Platt nor Sheen — the two comedians here — gets enough to do, and the movie turns into a sketchy, no-frills retread of the musketeer myth, as joyless a retro-swashbuckler as Kevin Costner’s Robin Hood. Despite Tim Curry’s dutiful mugging as the evil Cardinal Richelieu (by now, these 'scene-stealing; villains are every bit as predictable as the heroes they’re supposed to be upstaging), the castle-intrigue stuff is bland, and the swordplay is poorly filmed, with too much chop-chop editing and too many close-ups. We get the energy of battle without the dance."

Chris O'Donnell was nominated for a Golden Raspberry Award as Worst Supporting Actor for his work in the film, but lost to Woody Harrelson for Indecent Proposal.

Box office 
The film grossed $11.5 million in its opening weekend, placing it at number 1 at the US box office. It went on to gross $53.9 million in the United States and Canada and $57 million internationally for a worldwide total of $111 million.

Soundtrack 
Bryan Adams co-wrote "All for Love" with Robert John "Mutt" Lange and Michael Kamen for the movie's end credits, performing it with Rod Stewart and Sting. As Janet Maslin predicted, the song was a big hit (reaching No. 1 in North America and several other territories). Kamen also composed the movie's score, conducting the Greater Los Angeles All Star Orchestra.

The soundtrack album was released on compact disc and cassette on November 12, 1993 by Hollywood Records and Columbia Records in North America and A&M Records (the label to which both Adams and Sting were signed at the time) elsewhere.

 All For Love – Bryan Adams, Rod Stewart & Sting (4:45)
 The Cavern Of Cardinal Richelieu (Overture & Passacaille) (2:58)
 D'Artagnan (Galliard & Air) (3:19)
 Athos, Porthos And Aramis (Courante) (5:24)
 Sword Fight (Bransle) (3:20)
 King Louis XIII, Queen Anne And Constance/Lady In Waiting (Gavotte) (5:05)
 The Cardinal's Coach (Estampie) (4:45)
 Cannonballs (Rigadoon) (3:29)
 M'Lady DeWinter (Lament) (4:16)
 The Fourth Musketeer (Concert Royaux) (5:19)

Comic book adaptation 
 Marvel Comics: Disney's The Three Musketeers (January 1994)

References

External links 

 
 
 
 
 
 
 Roger Ebert review

1993 films
1990s English-language films
1990s action adventure films
1993 action comedy films
1990s adventure comedy films
American action adventure films
American action comedy films
American adventure comedy films
Austrian comedy films
Films directed by Stephen Herek
Films scored by Michael Kamen
Films produced by Roger Birnbaum
Films based on The Three Musketeers
Walt Disney Pictures films
Caravan Pictures films
Films shot in Vienna
Films shot in England
American swashbuckler films
Films set in 1625
Films set in France
Films set in Paris
Films with screenplays by David Loughery
Films adapted into comics
Secret histories
Cultural depictions of Louis XIII
Cultural depictions of Cardinal Richelieu
Films set in the 17th century
1990s American films